Perfectly Defect is an album by Mortiis, released 10 October 2010 initially as a free internet download, although later available through digital music shops such as iTunes. Prior to being released, the official Mortiis website had a countdown clock. The album was released in various formats including FLAC, MP3 and AAC.

A pressed CD version of the album by the name of "tour edition" was also released in limited numbers, mainly obtainable (as the name suggests) on the band's tour.

In 2018, a full 12 track version of the album was released commercially on CD/Vinyl/Digital formats. It included the original 8 tracks, plus four tracks recorded during the album's recording sessions, but were never made available until now.

Track listing
All songs written by H. Ellefsen.

References

External links
 

2010 albums
Albums free for download by copyright owner